Yordan Dimitrov Yordanov (born 28 September 1951), nicknamed "Pikata", is a Bulgarian former footballer and manager who played as a forward and made six appearances for the Bulgaria national team. He is a two times Bulgarian champion (1977, 1979) and three times Bulgarian Cup holder (1976, 1977, 1979). In 1976, he scored two goals against FC Barcelona for the famous Levski's 5 – 4 win in Sofia.

Career
Yordanov made his international debut for Bulgaria on 21 December 1975 in a UEFA Euro 1976 qualifying match against Malta, in which he scored the second goal of the 2–0 away win. He went on to make six appearances, scoring four goals, before making his last appearance on 2 April 1980 in a friendly match against Hungary, which finished as a 4–3 win.

Career statistics

International

International goals

References

External links
 
 
 
 Profile at LevskiSofia.info

1951 births
Living people
Bulgarian footballers
Bulgaria international footballers
Bulgarian expatriate footballers
Bulgarian expatriate sportspeople in Cyprus
Expatriate footballers in Cyprus
Association football forwards
PFC Levski Sofia players
PFC Litex Lovech players
PFC Minyor Pernik players
Anorthosis Famagusta F.C. players
First Professional Football League (Bulgaria) players
Cypriot First Division players
Bulgarian football managers
Expatriate football managers in Cyprus
Sportspeople from Sofia Province